India competed at the 2012 Winter Youth Olympics in Innsbruck, Austria. The India team was made up of one female athlete competing in alpine skiing.

Alpine skiing

India qualified one girl in alpine skiing.

Girl

See also
India at the 2012 Summer Olympics

References

2012 in Indian sport
Nations at the 2012 Winter Youth Olympics
India at the Youth Olympics